Thokar Niaz Baig (Punjabi) is a residential neighbourhood locality and a union council (UC 118) located in Iqbal Tehsil of Lahore, Punjab, Pakistan.

History
Before the partition of 1947, the town of Thokar Niaz Beg was located 7 miles outside of the city of Lahore.

A temple named Bhadrakali Mandir is located in the area. The area had somehow an equal population of Sikh, Muslim, and Hindu communities. After 1947, most of the houses of this area allotted to migrated Mewati families.

Transportation
Thokar Niaz Baig serves as the major point of entry into Lahore from the south/west. It serves as the junction between the M-2 motorway and N5 national highway (Multan Road) as well as the  Lahore Ring Road. Thokar Niaz Baig is also the site of the Lahore Jinnah Bus Terminal. In October 2020 a metro station of the Orange Line opened here.

References

Iqbal Town, Lahore
Populated places in Lahore District